Shawnee Mission South High School is a high school located in Overland Park, Kansas, United States, serving students in grades 9-12.  The school is one of several public high schools located within Shawnee Mission and operated by Shawnee Mission USD 512 school district.  The school colors are green and gold and the school mascot is the Raider. The average annual enrollment is approximately 1,600 students.  The school newspaper is called The Patriot.

History
Shawnee Mission South High School was established in 1966.

The school's mascot was chosen by the first graduating class of 1967. The Raider was chosen as a mascot because of the popular band Paul Revere & the Raiders.

Throughout its history, Shawnee Mission South has hosted several prominent concerts. The Who played a concert with The Buckinghams at Shawnee Mission South on November 17, 1967. The concert was performed in the gymnasium that currently still stands. The Byrds appeared in concert in the school's gymnasium in March 1969. The Amboy Dukes performed in a "senior class only" concert, in the football stadium, May, 1971. Brewer & Shipley performed in the cafeteria in 1976.

In 1983, Shawnee Mission South was named a Blue Ribbon School, the highest honor an American school can achieve. In 1997, the school was named a Blue Ribbon School for the second time in the school's history.

Academics
Shawnee Mission South High School is a two-time Blue Ribbon School, occurring in 1983 and 1997. Beginning in the 2007–2008 school year, the Shawnee Mission School District adopted a new program, Project Lead the Way, as the district's signature engineering program, offered at Shawnee Mission South High School. The classes for Lead the Way include Introduction to Engineering Design, Principles of Engineering, Digital Electronics, Aerospace Engineering, and Engineering Design and Development. Another program unique to Shawnee Mission South is that of the Center for International Studies. The Center for International Studies (CIS) provides intensive instruction in four languages: Arabic, Chinese, Japanese, and Russian. The program also provides students the opportunity to attend geopolitics classes rather than regular social studies courses. In 2005, South's Science Olympiad team made district news by winning the state of Kansas competition and advancing to the national level. As of January 22, 2012, the Shawnee Mission South Academic Decathlon team has won the Kansas State Academic Decathlon Competition and advanced to nationals for fifteen years in a row.

Extracurricular activities
The Raiders compete in the Sunflower League and are classified as a 6A school (despite the drop in enrollment), the largest classification in Kansas according to the Kansas State High School Activities Association. Throughout its history, Shawnee Mission South has won several state championships in various sports. Many graduates have gone on to participate in collegiate athletics.

Athletics

State championships

Notable alumni
 David Dastmalchian, actor
 Stephen Dolginoff, writer, composer
 Richard Gilliland, actor
 Gina Grad, voice actor, radio and podcast personality
 Neal Jeffrey, former Baylor and NFL quarterback
 Tom Kane, voice actor
 Steve Little, NFL football kicker and punter
 Mike Morin, MLB baseball player
 Rodney Peete, former USC and NFL quarterback; sports television broadcaster
 Rob Riggle, actor, comedian
 Vince Snowbarger, lawyer and politician
 Peter Spears, Academy Award-winning filmmaker and actor
 Carla Sunberg, 10th President of Nazarene Theological Seminary, 1979
 Bobby Voelker, professional mixed martial artist, current UFC Welterweight

See also

 List of high schools in Kansas
 List of unified school districts in Kansas
Other high schools in Shawnee Mission USD 512 school district
 Shawnee Mission East High School in Prairie Village
 Shawnee Mission North High School in Overland Park
 Shawnee Mission Northwest High School in Shawnee
 Shawnee Mission West High School in Overland Park

References

External links
 

Education in Overland Park, Kansas
Schools in Johnson County, Kansas
Public high schools in Kansas
Educational institutions established in 1966
1966 establishments in Kansas